Ridlington is a village and civil parish in Rutland in the East Midlands of England. The population of the village was 202 at the time of the 2001 census, including Ayston, Leighfield and Wardley also increasing to 260 at the 2011 census.

The village's name means 'farm/settlement of Redel'.

The Church of England parish church is Saint Mary Magdalene and Saint Andrew. It is a Grade II* listed building.

The Village Hall on Main Street was originally the Ridlington Village Primary School, built in 1873. The Diocese of Peterborough made it over to the Parish Council in 1964 when the school closed.

Ridlington was the home of Hugh Boyville, a landowner and Member of Parliament for Rutland in the 15th century. The prominent Harington family had their seat here and one branch were created the Harington Baronets, of Ridlington in 1611.

External links

 Ridlington Parish Council
 RutNet

References

Villages in Rutland
Civil parishes in Rutland